K.M. Hemayet Ullah Auranga (1955 – 3 August 2013) was a Bangladesh Nationalist Party politician and served as the Jatiya Sangsad member from the Shariatpur-1 constituency twice - first in 1991 on the Awami League ticket and in 2001 as an independent candidate.

Career
Auranga was born in 1955 at Dakshin Damudya village, East Pakistan (now in Damudya Upazila, Bangladesh).

Auranga was elected from Shariatpur-1 in 1991 as a candidate of the Bangladesh Awami League. He was elected to Parliament in 2001 as an Independent candidate after losing the Awami League nomination. He joined Bangladesh Nationalist Party in 2007 over internal disputes in the Awami League. He was nominated by the Bangladesh Nationalist Party for the 2008 election in Shariatpur-3. He lost the election to Abdur Razzaq, the Awami League candidate.

Death 
Auranga was killed in a road accident in Munshiganj on 3 August 2013.

References

1955 births
2013 deaths
People from Shariatpur District
Awami League politicians
Bangladesh Nationalist Party politicians
5th Jatiya Sangsad members
7th Jatiya Sangsad members
Road incident deaths in Bangladesh
Date of birth missing
Dhaka College alumni